Foudroyant has been the name of several ships, both British and French:

 HMS Foudroyant—for British ships of this name.
 French ship Foudroyant—for French ships of this name.